Filip Racko (born July 20, 1985) is a Czech footballer who played in the First League for Banik Ostrava and 1. FC Slovácko.

External links

1985 births
Living people
Czech footballers
Association football midfielders
Czech First League players
FC Baník Ostrava players
SK Kladno players
1. FC Slovácko players
MFK Vítkovice players
FK Čáslav players
FC Nitra players
1. FC Lokomotive Leipzig players
Czech expatriate footballers
Expatriate footballers in Germany
Czech expatriate sportspeople in Germany
People from Havířov
Sportspeople from the Moravian-Silesian Region